Cardiff Central railway station is a major station on the South Wales Main Line, located in the capital of Wales, Cardiff. It is one of the city's two urban rail network hubs, along with Cardiff Queen Street. Opened in 1850 as Cardiff station, it was renamed Cardiff General in 1924, and then Cardiff Central in 1973.

The station is located at Central Square, in Cardiff city centre. The Grade II listed building is managed by Transport for Wales Rail, and is both the largest and busiest station in Wales.

Cardiff Central is one of twenty railway stations in the city and one of two in the city centre, serving as a hub for the Valleys & Cardiff Local Routes. It is an interchange for services between South Wales, West Wales and North Wales, as well as other major British cities.

History

Early history
In the early 1840s the South Wales Railway was trying to find a suitable site for a railway station, but the area that is now Cardiff Central railway station was prone to flooding. It was Isambard Kingdom Brunel's solution to divert the River Taff to the west, creating a larger and safer site for the station. Through services from Cardiff to London Paddington began on 19 July 1852, when the Chepstow Railway Bridge was opened, completing the connection between the South Wales Railway and the Great Western Railway. The South Wales Railway was absorbed into the GWR in 1863.

The South Wales Railway had originally been built as a broad-gauge railway, but on the weekend of 11–12 May 1872, the entire South Wales system was converted to standard gauge.

Cardiff to London trains originally ran via the circuitous route via  and took an average of five hours. This was reduced to around four hours from 1886 when the Severn Tunnel was opened creating a shorter route via Bristol and Bath. In 1903 another shortcut, the Badminton railway line was opened, bypassing Bath and Bristol, and this reduced the Cardiff-London journey times by another hour. By the 1930s, the fastest Cardiff-London trains took around 2 hours 40 minutes, and this remained fairly static until 1961, when the diesel Blue Pullman service reduced the fastest journey time to 2 hours 7 minutes. In October 1976 the InterCity 125 services were introduced, reducing the fastest journey times to 1 hour 53 minutes.

The original 'Cardiff' station as it was then known had four through tracks running through the site, and consisted of two through platforms each with its own bay platform. During the 1890s the station underwent considerable expansion, in 1896 a flying junction was constructed connecting the station to nearby Cardiff Queen Street station, and extra platforms were added to accommodate the new Taff Vale services, bringing the total number up to six.

Initially named Cardiff, the station was renamed Cardiff General in July 1924 and then Cardiff Central by British Rail in May 1973.

1930s rebuild

Between 1931 and 1934, the station underwent a major rebuild, designed by the GWR's architects department under their chief architect Percy Emerson Culverhouse, the centrepiece of this was a new Art Deco entrance building faced in Portland stone, containing a booking hall and concourse with noted Art Deco light fittings, all topped by a clock cupola. The current Art Deco lamps in the booking hall are replicas of the originals, installed in 1999, having been funded by the Railway Heritage Trust. A GWR war memorial is located at the eastern end of the concourse. 

The Great Western Railway has its full name carved onto the façade (larger than the name of the station). The rebuild also saw a number of other improvements including the lengthening of the platforms, the widening of the Taff River railway bridge to allow the approach lines to the station to be quadrupled, and the installation of colour-light signalling. The rebuild of the station cost the GWR £820,000,, and was formally opened by the Minister of Transport Oliver Stanley on 26 February 1934.

It proved so successful that larger railcars with more seating and no buffet had to be introduced to cope with demand, and even this had to be augmented by a normal locomotive hauled service. During the Second World War, two such trains ran to and from Cardiff daily.

As a result of representations by the GWR, a nearby working-class district, Temperance Town, was cleared during the late 1930s in order to improve the outlook of the rebuilt station.

In 1992, the station, its buildings and platforms, became Grade II listed.

Cardiff Riverside railway station

On 14 August 1893 the GWR opened the adjacent Cardiff Riverside  station which had two platforms located to the south of and adjacent to the main Cardiff station which curved away to the south on the Cardiff Riverside Branch, which ran to its terminus at  about one mile to the south. Riverside station was rebuilt as an island platform with two platform faces in the early 1930s at the same time as Cardiff General was being rebuilt. On 28 October 1940 Riverside station was formally incorporated into Cardiff General station with its platforms being designated 8 and 9. The Riverside platforms were closed for passenger use on 16 March 1964, but they continued to be used for parcels and newspaper traffic for a number of years after. They were demolished in 1994 after becoming disused.

21st century developments

Electrification

In June 2010, Network Rail began its £5 billion Great Western electrification project which promised the construction of overhead line equipment, station improvements, and resignalling along parts of the Great Western Main Line and the South Wales Main Line. The changes would see the retirement of InterCity 125 trains on London services, and the introduction of Hitachi designed British Rail Class 800 electric trains, under a side project named the Intercity Express Programme.

Electrification to Cardiff was to be completed by 2018, but late that year Network Rail announced that completion would be delayed a further year.

The first electric services began at Cardiff Central on 5 January 2020, starting with a single 5-car Class 800 forming the 08:50 Cardiff to London. Trains were unable to operate on electric power through the Severn Tunnel due to difficult operating conditions in the 133-year-old tunnel, but the service was fully electrified by June 2020.

Station improvements

In 2011 it was announced that Cardiff Central would be enhanced with a new platform ('Platform 8') and a new two-storey southern entrance and booking hall. This was part of a £200m regeneration scheme to boost train capacity in Cardiff and the surrounding areas. With work planned to start from June 2014, the Assembly Government committed £7m for the overall programme.

The old Grade II listed Water Tower (next to Platform 0 and the River Taff) was repainted in 2012 in the original brown and beige colours of the Great Western Railway.

The new entrance on the south side of the station, was opened in September 2015, and the new platform  8 on the south side of the station, opened in January 2017, allowing the number of trains on the busy Cardiff Central to Cardiff Queen Street corridor to be increased from 12 to 16 per hour. This was opened in conjunction with a resignalling scheme in the station, which saw all of the station's platforms signalled to become bi-directional, in order to increase the flexibility of the operations.

Central Square
A major redevelopment scheme began in 2015 of Central Square in front of the main station entrance, of which Network Rail owned part. 500,000 square feet of new office space were planned for the area formerly occupied by Cardiff Central bus station. The landscaping, designed to create a positive impression to visitors exiting the railway station, would include a major pedestrianised route between the railway station and the Millennium Stadium.

Future proposals

In 2015, plans were unveiled to substantially redevelop the station in order to cope with the expected rise in passenger numbers, which are projected to rise from the current 13 million to 32 million by 2043. The proposed redevelopment would see an enlarged glass fronted concourse which would leave the current 1930s façade intact.

It was announced in July 2019 that significant upgrades would take place at Cardiff Central under a £38m improvement project, which also proposes a £20m West Wales Parkway station north of Swansea in order to reduce journey times between Cardiff and West Wales.

In August 2020 it was announced that Cardiff Central would be upgraded. Design work had already begun on a £113m upgrade which is expected to be funded by £40m from the Cardiff Capital Region group of local authorities, £15m from Transport for Wales and from the UK Department for Transport. It is envisaged that work will begin in 2022, but that would depend upon the design and development exercise.

Station layout and platforms

There are two entrances to the station. The northern main entrance leads to the main concourse and is on Central Square. The Millennium Stadium is a short distance to the northwest.

The southern entrance is at the rear of the station on Tresillian Way, accessed from Penarth Road, where the station car park is found.

The railway lines are above the station concourses. Two subways, one each at the eastern and western side of the station, run parallel under the tracks linking the two main entrances, from which the platforms are accessed by stairs and lifts, with the exception of Platform 0 which is accessed from the main concourse near Marks and Spencer.

Cardiff Central has eight platforms, numbered 0, 1a/b, 2a/b, 3a/b, 4a/b, 6a/b, 7a/b and 8. There is no longer, despite signage, a Platform 5; this was a west-facing bay platform situated between Platforms 3 and 4 which was removed in the 1960s. Platform 0, a short through platform at the north of the station was created in 1999.

The station has ten tracks running through it. All but two of the tracks have an adjacent platform, and the remaining two are through lines for goods trains and other non-stopping traffic.

Platforms 3 and 4 are divided into 'A' and 'B' sections and are capable of holding two local trains or a nine car Class 800 train. Other platforms can be used by more than one train, but are not all sectioned.

Platforms 0 to 4 are typically used by longer distance regional and national services operated by Transport for Wales Rail, Great Western Railway, and CrossCountry to destinations including  London Paddington, Derby, Nottingham, Taunton, Holyhead and Chester.

To the West of the station lies Canton TMD, operated by Transport for Wales Rail, as well as the junction splitting trains to Penarth and the Vale of Glamorgan, Swansea, and Valley line services via Ninian Park and Radyr.  To the East of the station lies Cardiff Queen Street (for Cardiff local and Valley Line services), and the mainline toward Newport, Bristol and London.

Facilities 
The majority of facilities are in the main concourse, including ticket desks and machines, cash machines, an information desk, departure and arrival screens, public telephones, a newsagent, and food shops. The station has the only First Class waiting room in Wales.  Outside, a pay-and-display car park provides 248 spaces.

British Transport Police maintains a presence at Cardiff Central.

Additional ticket barriers were installed in the main entrance of the station in November 2019 as part of plans to reduce congestion at the station at peak times. A study found that the station can see over 40,000 people use the station on major event days in the city. The work was funded by Transport for Wales, who also aimed to refurbish toilets, install more ticket machines, phone charging points, and build cycle storage in 2020. Cardiff Central's customer numbers are forecast to top 34 million users annually by 2043.

In January 2020, Transport for Wales installed a dedicated passenger assistance meeting point in the ticket hall of the station, stating it would provide a comfortable and identifiable location for those needing assistance to wait while their booked assistance is prepared, for example the preparation of boarding aids.

Services

Three train operators run services to Cardiff Central, a summary is as follows:

Transport for Wales Rail:
Operate frequent local commuter services on the Valleys & Cardiff Local Routes; the local urban rail network.
A premium daily return service to Holyhead known as the Premier Service is also run.
Infrequent boat trains to and from Fishguard Harbour, connecting with the Stena Line ferry to Rosslare Harbour in Ireland.
Great Western Railway:
CrossCountry:
Operate an hourly service to  via ,  and 
 Also operate 2 trains per day to Bristol Temple Meads

Routes

Incidents 
On 4 May 1998, eleven wagons of freight train which was carrying iron ore from Port Talbot derailed just east of the station, causing substantial damage to the track, as well as blocking the main line into the station. This caused enormous disruption to the services which lasted for several days. No-one however was injured in the incident.

To the east of the platforms, the Valley Lines tracks rise up and cross over the South Wales Main Line using a bridge. Rail services were severely disrupted in August 2012 when the retaining wall between the tracks partially collapsed, spilling five tonnes of earth. It was expected that repairs could take two weeks. There were worries that the bronze medal match in the 2012 Summer Olympics men's football competition, held at the nearby Cardiff Millennium Stadium could be disrupted, but most fans were due to arrive by the main line rather than the Valley Lines. There had been severe congestion at the station earlier in the month due to another Olympic match.

In December 2016, a serious accident was narrowly averted by the alertness of a driver. During the Cardiff Area Resignalling Scheme, a set of points had been left in an unsafe condition, and undetectable by the signalling system. The Rail Accident Investigation Branch report into the incident revealed that lessons learnt following the Clapham Junction rail crash in December 1988 appeared to have been forgotten. Excessive working hours and a lack of detailed planning were cited as contributory factors.

Media
In 2020, the Rail Delivery Group nominated Cardiff Central as one of the Welsh stations as a contender for the World Cup of Stations. It passed the group stages and was the Wales contender in the semi-finals. However, it lost to Stourbridge Junction railway station to reach the final in the west region.

See also 
 List of railway stations in Wales
 Transport in Wales
 Commuter rail in the United Kingdom
 Rail transport in Cardiff

References

Bibliography

Further reading

External links 

Grade II listed buildings in Cardiff
Grade II listed railway stations in Wales
Central
DfT Category A stations
Former Great Western Railway stations
Railway stations in Great Britain opened in 1850
Railway stations served by CrossCountry
Railway stations served by Great Western Railway
Railway stations served by Transport for Wales Rail
South Wales Main Line
Art Deco railway stations
Art Deco architecture in Wales
Castle, Cardiff